ICE in the context of chemotherapy is an acronym for one of the chemotherapy regimens, used in salvage treatment of relapsed or refractory non-Hodgkin's lymphoma and Hodgkin lymphoma.

In case of CD20-positive B cell lymphoid malignancies the ICE regimen is often combined today with rituximab. This regimen is then called ICE-R or R-ICE or RICE.

[R]-ICE regimen consists of:
 Rituximab - an anti-CD20 monoclonal antibody, which is able to kill both normal and malignant CD20-bearing B cells;
 Ifosfamide - an alkylating antineoplastic agent of the oxazafosforine group;
 Carboplatin - a platinum-based antineoplastic drug, also an alkylating antineoplastic agent;
 Etoposide - a topoisomerase inhibitor.

Dosing regimen

Cycles are repeated every 14 days for 3 cycles, then high-dose chemotherapy with autologous stem-cell transplantation follows (if the patient is considered eligible for HDCT and ASCT).

References

Chemotherapy regimens used in lymphoma